William Tai Tin (born 11 June 1985) is an Australian-Samoan judoka who has represented Samoa at the Commonwealth Games.

Tai Tin is from Siumu and Manono Island, but lives in Melbourne, Australia.

On 14 July 2022 he was selected as part of Samoa's team for the 2022 Commonwealth Games in Birmingham.

References

External links
 

Living people
People from Tuamasaga
People from Aiga-i-le-Tai
Samoan expatriate sportspeople in Australia
Samoan male judoka
Commonwealth Games competitors for Samoa
Year of birth missing (living people)